Jack Barnett may refer to:

Jack Barnett (baseball) (1879–1923), American baseball player
Jack Barnett (footballer) (1899–1979), Australian rules footballer
Jack Barnett (politician) (1869–1945), full name John "Jack" Septimus Barnett, deputy mayor of Christchurch from 1938 to 1941
John Barnett (rugby) (1881–1918), known as Jack, Australian rugby union and rugby league player